Walkley Yard was built in 1955 by the National Capital Commission to relocate the Canadian National Railway yard, to make way for construction of the Queensway. The northerly part was later acquired by the current owner Canadian Pacific Railway in 1967, when they moved from LeBreton Flats. An OC Transpo facility was added in 2001 to allow indoor servicing for the O-Train Trillium Line's diesel-powered fleet. The Canadian National and Ottawa Central Railway still occupy the southerly portion of the freight yard.

See also
 Belfast Yard on the Confederation Line

References

External links

O-Train
Canadian Pacific Railway facilities
1955 establishments in Ontario
National Capital Commission
Railway depots in Canada